or  is a Greek folk dance from Thrace, in 2+2+3   and  pattern.   is a couples' dance that takes its name from the  ('handkerchiefs') that are held while performing it.  is often performed in Thrace and the Black Sea Region during wedding processions. There are similar folkloric dance tunes known as Laz bar in Armenia.

See also
Greek music
Greek folk music
Syrtos
Greek dances
Music of Thrace

External links
Mandilatos (Thraki)
Performance of Mandilatos (Thraki)
Laz bar (Hicaz mandra)
Kolo iz Stare Srbije
Tabancamın Sapını (Rize)
Hicaz Mandıra

Greek dances
Greek music
Armenian dances
Turkish dances
Serbian dances